Severino Lucini (born 21 October 1929) is an Italian rower. He competed in the men's double sculls event at the 1960 Summer Olympics.

References

External links
 

1929 births
Possibly living people
Italian male rowers
Olympic rowers of Italy
Rowers at the 1960 Summer Olympics
Sportspeople from the Province of Como